Pseudohermonassa is a genus of moths of the family Noctuidae. Some species were formerly placed in Xestia.

Species
Pseudohermonassa bicarnea (Guenée, 1852)
Pseudohermonassa flavotincta (J.B. Smith, 1892) 
Pseudohermonassa melancholica (Lederer, 1853)
Pseudohermonassa ononensis (Bremer, 1861)
Pseudohermonassa tenuicula (Morrison, 1874)
Pseudohermonassa velata (Staudinger, 1888)

References
Natural History Museum Lepidoptera genus database

Noctuinae